Christ Church, Ottershaw is a Church of England church on Guildford Road in the village of Ottershaw in the Runnymede district of Surrey, England, about 20 miles south-west of London. Grade II listed, it was designed by Sir George Gilbert Scott (1811–78).

Sir Edward Colebrooke (1813–90), who came to live in Ottershaw in 1859, built a chapel on his estate in 1863 as a memorial to his deceased son and heir. Later this became the village church.

The church, one of the few polychromatic brick churches designed by Scott, retains most of its original features. A tower, the gift of Edward Gibb, was added in 1885 and new parish rooms in the 1990s.

The nave and chancel windows, designed by Charles Eamer Kempe (1837–1907), contain several examples of Kempe's signature, a tiny wheatsheaf. They were installed in 1901, replacing the original plain glass. Kempe also designed the altar piece. Installed in 1901, it was made by the Sussex-based firm Norman and Burt and incorporates wooden figures carved in Oberammergau, in Bavaria, Germany.

Two Commonwealth servicemen of World War II – Leading Aircraftman George Barnett of the Royal Air Force Volunteer Reserve (who died on 17 October 1943) and Corporal Alexander Cook of the Worcestershire Regiment (who died on 21 September 1947) – are buried in the churchyard.

References

Further reading
 Binns, Sheila (2014): Sir Edward Colebrooke of Abington and Ottershaw, Baronet and Member of Parliament: The Four Lives of an Extraordinary Victorian, Grosvenor House Publishing Ltd, 278 pp.

External links
Official website

1863 establishments in England
19th-century Church of England church buildings
Churches completed in 1863
Church of England church buildings in Surrey
Churchyards in England
Commonwealth War Graves Commission cemeteries in England
Diocese of Guildford
George Gilbert Scott buildings
Grade II listed churches in Surrey
Ottershaw